The Ussuri dhole (Cuon alpinus alpinus), also known as the Indian dhole, Eastern Asiatic dhole, Chinese dhole or southern dhole, is the nominate subspecies of the dhole native to East Asia. The Ussuri dhole is also native to China, however it is probably extinct in most of its ranges in China, as well as in Mongolia and the Russian Far East.

Physical descriptions

The Ussuri dhole is the largest subspecies. It has a bright red coat and a narrow skull. Like the Tian Shan dhole, the Ussuri dhole has a woolly winter coat, white underfur and larger mane during the cold season. On the other hand, the summer coat is coarser and leaner. The dholes from southern Asia have darker coarse and leaner fur which is mostly found in the Sumatran dhole, with the red underfur nearly visible.

Habitat and distribution
The Ussuri dhole lives in forests, plains, grasslands, savannahs, steppes and alpine tundra. It is the most widespread subspecies, ranging from South to Northeast Asia. It occurs in India, Nepal, China, Bangladesh, Myanmar and Thailand. It was believed to be extinct in Mongolia, Siberia and Korea, though it is disputed that dholes persist in those countries.

Hunting and diet
The Indian wild dogs feed on small and larger herbivorous mammals such as chital, muntjac, sambar, barasingha, chousingha, chinkara, blackbuck, hog deer, wild boar, water buffalo, nilgai and gaur. On few occasions, Ussuri dholes also hunt elephant and rhino calves, and may also feed on onagers and kiangs.

Threats and enemies
Dholes are listed as an endangered species due to low densities. However, threats such as poaching, illegal hunting and the fur trade no longer pose significant threats to dholes. The species is highly protected in many countries, such as in Cambodia. The dholes in certain regions are mostly threatened by lack of prey and habitat loss.

Dholes are also vulnerable to diseases from areas where they share the same habitats with other canids like wolves and Eurasian golden jackals. Ussuri dholes may also be threatened by fellow apex predators such as tigers, leopards, wolves, striped hyenas and bears, and formerly by Asiatic lions and Asiatic cheetahs.

References

Dhole
Mammals of East Asia
Fauna of South Asia
Mammals of India
Mammals of Nepal
Mammals of Korea
Mammals of Thailand
Mammals of Mongolia
Mammals of China
Mammals of Russia